Christians have made many contributions in a broad and diverse range of fields, including the sciences, arts, politics, literatures, sports and business.

Clergy
 List of Abbots of Abingdon
 List of Abunas of Ethiopia
 List of Anglican diocesan bishops in Britain and Ireland
 Roman Catholic Archbishop of Atlanta
 List of Archbishops of Cyprus
 List of Archbishops of Uppsala
 List of Armenian Catholicoi of Cilicia
 List of Armenian Patriarchs of Constantinople
 List of Armenian Patriarchs of Jerusalem
 Lists of patriarchs, archbishops, and bishops
 List of cardinals
 List of cardinal-nephews
 List of members of the Holy Synod of the Romanian Orthodox Church
 List of Lutheran clergy
 Master of the Order of Preachers
 List of Metropolitans and Patriarchs of Moscow
 List of Orthodox dioceses and archdioceses
 Lists of Patriarchs
 List of current patriarchs
 List of Christian pastors in politics
 List of popes
 List of popes (graphical)
 List of preachers
 List of primates of the Orthodox Church in America
 List of American televangelists
 List of televangelists in Brazil
 List of women priests

By denomination
Many denominations of Christianity exist today. Featured below are members of some of them.

 Lists of Catholics
 List of Maronites
 List of Eastern Orthodox Christians
 List of Protestants
 List of Anglicans
 List of Baptists
 List of evangelical Christians
 List of Mennonites
 List of Methodists
 List of Pentecostals
 List of Assemblies of God people
 List of people associated with Australian Christian Churches
 List of Presbyterians
 List of Australian Presbyterians
 List of Irish Presbyterians
 List of Puritans
 List of Seventh-day Adventists
 List of Nontrinitarians
 List of Christian Scientists (religious denomination)
 List of Christian Universalists
 List of Unitarians, Universalists, and Unitarian Universalists
 List of Latter Day Saints

By nationality
 List of Middle Eastern Christians
 Armenia:
 List of Armenian Catholicoi of Cilicia
 List of Armenian Patriarchs of Constantinople
 List of Armenian Patriarchs of Jerusalem
 Australia:
 List of people associated with the Assemblies of God in Australia
 List of notable Australian Presbyterians
 Brazil: List of televangelists in Brazil
 Britain: List of Anglican diocesan bishops in Britain and Ireland
 Cyprus: List of Archbishops of Cyprus
 Ethiopia: List of Abunas of Ethiopia
 Ireland:
 List of Anglican diocesan bishops in Britain and Ireland
 List of Irish Presbyterians
 Pakistan: List of Pakistani Christians
 Palestine: List of Palestinian Christians
 Romania: List of members of the Holy Synod of the Romanian Orthodox Church
 Russia: List of Metropolitans and Patriarchs of Moscow
 Sweden: List of Archbishops of Uppsala
 United States:
 List of American televangelists
 Roman Catholic Archbishop of Atlanta

By profession (non-clerical)

 List of Roman Catholic Church artists
 List of Catholic authors
 List of Catholic scientists
 List of Protestant authors
 List of Knights Templar
 List of Christian missionaries
 List of Protestant missionaries in China
 List of Roman Catholic Church musicians
 List of Christians in science and technology
 List of Christian Nobel laureates
 List of Catholic philosophers and theologians
 List of Christian theologians

Other
 List of Christian socialists
 List of converts to Christianity
 Christian martyrs
 List of members of Opus Dei
 List of Protestant Reformers
 List of people with Restoration Movement ties
 List of saints
 List of Roman Catholic cleric-scientists
 List of Christian leftists
 List of Christian democrats

See also
 List of Christian denominations
 Lists of people by belief
 List of lists of lists